Juniperus formosana, the Formosan juniper, is a species of conifer in the family Cupressaceae.

References

formosana
Trees of China
Trees of Taiwan
Flora of Tibet
Least concern plants
Taxonomy articles created by Polbot